Johanna Niese, known as Hansi Niese (10 November 1875 in Vienna – 4 April 1934) was an Austrian actress.

Career
Hansi Niese made her debut at age 18 in 1891 in the South Moravian town of Znojmo at the local theater. Her success story began in 1893 at the Vienna Raimund Theater, where she appeared in the series for six years as a soubrette. In 1899 she moved to the theater an der Josefstadt. Soon after, she married Josef Jarno, the director of this theater.

Not only at the various stages of Vienna, but also on tour in Berlin Niese has starred in numerous plays by including Ludwig Anzengruber, Gerhart Hauptmann, Ferenc Molnár, Johann Nestroy, Ferdinand Raimund and Arthur Schnitzler. She also appeared in several farces and operettas (around 1907 as "Försterchristl" in the eponymous operetta her brother Georg Jarno) and often as a partner of Alexander Girardi.

In the thirties Niese starred in several films, including 1931 in "An Affair" and 1932 in "Hussars love."

Personal life 
She was married to Josef Jarno. After his death in 1932, she was saddled with his debts and as a result took on a more frugal lifestyle.

Death and legacy 
Niese died

At Vienna's Central Cemetery (Group 14 C, Number 4) of the popular actress has dedicated a memorial grave. In 1935, in Vienna in the 19th Döbling the Hansi Niese Alley and 1955 in the 13 District of Vienna named the Hansi Niese-way to her. There is a statue of her outside the Volkstheater, Vienna.

Filmography

References 

1875 births
1934 deaths
Austrian silent film actresses
Austrian stage actresses
Austrian film actresses
19th-century Austrian actresses
20th-century Austrian actresses